The Aesthetics of Shadow: Lighting and Japanese Cinema is a 2013 book written by Daisuke Miyao. As the title suggests, the book is based on the cinema of Japan.

References

2013 non-fiction books
Books about film
Duke University Press books